Imogene Opton (born April 25, 1932) is an American alpine skier. She competed in two events at the 1952 Winter Olympics.

References

External links
 

1932 births
Living people
American female alpine skiers
Olympic alpine skiers of the United States
Alpine skiers at the 1952 Winter Olympics
Sportspeople from Berlin
21st-century American women